Podoscypha is a genus of fungi in the family Meruliaceae. The genus has a widespread distribution, especially in tropical regions, and contains about 35 species.

Species
Podoscypha aculeata (Berk. & M.A.Curtis) Boidin (1959)
Podoscypha bolleana (Mont.) Boidin (1960)
Podoscypha brasiliensis D.A.Reid (1965)
Podoscypha bubalina D.A.Reid (1965)
Podoscypha caespitosa (Burt) Boidin (1959)
Podoscypha corbiformis (Fr.) D.A.Reid (1965)
Podoscypha corneri D.A.Reid (1965)
Podoscypha crenata (Lév.) Pat. (1900)
Podoscypha cristata (Berk. & M.A.Curtis) D.A.Reid (1965)
Podoscypha disseminata Douanla-Meli (2004)
Podoscypha elegans (G.Mey.) Pat. (1900)
Podoscypha fulvonitens (Berk.) D.A.Reid (1965)
Podoscypha gillesii Boidin & Lanq. (1973)
Podoscypha glabrescens (Berk. & M.A.Curtis) Boidin (1959)
Podoscypha involuta (Klotzsch) Imazeki (1952)
Podoscypha macrorhiza (Lév.) Pat. (1900)
Podoscypha mellissii (Berk. ex Sacc.) Bres. (1928)
Podoscypha moelleri (Bres. & Henn.) D.A.Reid (1965)
Podoscypha moselei (Berk.) D.A.Reid (1965)
Podoscypha multizonata (Berk. & Broome) Pat. (1928)
Podoscypha nitidula (Berk.) Pat. (1903)
Podoscypha nuda Boidin (1966)
Podoscypha obliquula (S.Ito & S.Imai) S.Ito (1955)
Podoscypha ovalispora D.A.Reid (1965)
Podoscypha parvula (Lloyd) D.A.Reid (1965)
Podoscypha petalodes (Berk.) Boidin (1959)
Podoscypha philippinensis D.A.Reid (1965)
Podoscypha poilanei Pat. (1928)
Podoscypha pusillum (Berk.) Ryvarden (2015)
Podoscypha ravenelii (Berk. & M.A.Curtis) Pat. (1900)
Podoscypha replicata (Lloyd) D.A.Reid (1965)
Podoscypha sergentiorum Maire (1917)
Podoscypha thozetii (Berk.) Boidin (1959)
Podoscypha tomentipes (Overh.) D.A.Reid (1965)
Podoscypha ursina Boidin & Berthet (1960)
Podoscypha venustula (Speg.) D.A.Reid (1965)
Podoscypha vespillonea (Berk.) Boidin & Lanq. (1973)
Podoscypha warneckeana (Henn.) Ryvarden (1997)
Podoscypha xanthopus-concinna (Lloyd) D.A. Reid (1975)

References

Meruliaceae
Polyporales genera
Taxa described in 1900
Taxa named by Narcisse Théophile Patouillard